Taraguilla (sometimes called Taraguillas) is a small town located near Algeciras in the Province of Cadiz.

Description
Immediately to the north is the community of Estación de San Roque, built around the eponymous railway station, while the community of Miraflores is situated just to the east. The A-405 road to Jimena de la Frontera runs to the west of Taraguilla and the Autovía A-7 defines the southern edge of the town. To the west, across the A-405 road, is the Guadarranque river. In 2010 a bypass was built that improved links to the A-405 and the A-7 whilst avoiding Taraguille. The surrounding area is heavily industrialised. The CEPSA Gibraltar-San Roque oil refinery is located a short distance to the south on the other side of the A-7. A number of bus routes pass through Taraguilla.

References

Populated places in the Province of Cádiz